On the Shore of the Wide World is a play by English playwright Simon Stephens. It opened 18 April 2005, at the Royal Exchange Theatre, Manchester, under the direction of Sarah Frankcom. On May 26, the production transferred to the Cottesloe space of the Royal National Theatre in London.

The play focuses on three generations of the Holmes family in Stockport, England, examining the persistent dreams and struggles facing each generation. The play takes its title from the poem When I have Fears that I may Cease to Be by John Keats.

Characters

Awards and nominations 
 2006 Laurence Olivier Award for Best New Play

References

External links

2005 plays
Laurence Olivier Award-winning plays
West End plays
Plays by Simon Stephens